NTR2 may refer to:

 No Through Road (web series)#ep2
 NTR: Mahanayakudu